Sharda University is a private university located in Knowledge Park III, Greater Noida, Uttar Pradesh, India.

The school is part of the Sharda Group of Institutions, which was founded by P.K Gupta in 1996. The group has campuses in Agra, Mathura, and Greater Noida. Sharda University has accredited with A+ status by the National Assessment and Accreditation Council in 2022. It's scored 3.27 out of 4 NAAC score in the second cycle.

"Sharda", the name of the university, is another name for Saraswati, the Hindu goddess of knowledge, music, arts, and wisdom.

References

External links
 

2009 establishments in Uttar Pradesh
Educational institutions established in 2009
Education in Gautam Buddh Nagar district
Private universities in Uttar Pradesh